Douglas Tottle (born 1944, believed to have died 2003 or earlier) was a Canadian trade union activist and journalist, author of the Fraud, Famine, and Fascism: The Ukrainian Genocide Myth from Hitler to Harvard. In the book Tottle denies that the 1932–33 Holodomor in Ukraine was an artificial famine intentionally used by the Soviet government to kill Ukrainians, and asserts that the it is propaganda spread by former Nazis, anti-communists, and Ukrainian nationalists, sometimes posing as academics in Canadian universities. 

Tottle's critics regard him as a "Soviet apologist", or a "denunciator" of the famine. Tottle has been defended by the Stalin Society, author Jeff Coplon, educator Grover Furr, and the Swedish Communist Party, all of whom insist that his book is valid historical research that exposed the "myth of the famine-genocide [...] once and for all". Tottle's work was submitted to the International Commission of Inquiry Into the 1932–33 Famine in Ukraine and was examined as evidence during the Brussels sitting of the commission.

Biography 

Tottle was born in Quebec, but later lived mainly in Western Canada. He had various jobs throughout his working life, including photo-lab technician, fine artist, miner and steelworker. As a trade union activist, he edited The Challenger, a journal of the United Steelworkers, from 1975 to 1985. Tottle also researched labour history and worked as a union organiser, for example among Chicano farm workers in California and Native Indian farm workers in Manitoba. Tottle has written for various Canadian and American publications.

Holodomor denial in Fraud, Famine, and Fascism 

Douglas Tottle is mostly known for his book Fraud, Famine, and Fascism: the Ukrainian Genocide Myth from Hitler to Harvard in which he argues that the theory that the Soviet famine of 1932–33 was intentionally orchestrated by the USSR, was a creation of Nazis propagandists, thence perpetuated in America by newspaper magnate William Randolph Hearst. Tottle argues that although mistakes in Soviet economic policy were contributors to the famine, other factors including kulak sabotage, hoarding of grain, weather conditions and foreign sanctions also contributed. 

Tottle writes that he is more interested in the "Nazi and fascist connections" and the "coverups of wartime collaboration". In 1988, the International Commission of Inquiry Into the 1932–33 Famine in Ukraine was set up to establish whether the famine existed and its cause. Tottle was invited by the commission to attend the hearings, but did not respond. Tottle's book was examined during the Brussels sitting of the commission, held between May 23–27, 1988, with testimony from various expert witnesses. Commission president Jacob Sundberg subsequently concluded that Tottle was not alone in doubting a "famine-genocide", alluding to the fact that material included in his book could not have been available without official Soviet assistance.

Anne Applebaum theorizes that institutes of the Soviet government contributed to its writing, reviewed manuscripts and that Soviet diplomats also promoted the book. She also states that this may have been a political response to the publication of Robert Conquest's The Harvest of Sorrow in the preceding year.

References 

1944 births
Canadian non-fiction writers
Canadian trade unionists
Possibly living people
United Steelworkers people
Writers about the Soviet Union
Writers from Quebec